Le onde (Italian "The Waves") is an album released in 1996 by the Italian pianist Ludovico Einaudi. The album is based on the novel The Waves by British writer Virginia Woolf, and was Einaudi's first solo piano album.  The album enjoyed mainstream success, particularly in Italy and the UK.

The inside of the CD booklet reads "If it were a story it would be set on the seafront of a long beach. A beach without beginning and without end. The story of a man who walks along this shore and perhaps never meets anyone. His gaze lingers occasionally to look at some object or fragment brought from the sea. The footprints of a crab or a solitary seagull. I always take the sand, the sky, some clouds, the sea. Only the waves change, always the same and different, smaller. larger. Shorter. Longer."

Track analysis

Le onde
Le onde is a slow and flowing piece.  Einaudi claimed that he wrote the piece "Le onde" when he was thinking of The Waves.

The piece is split into parts, with each part being repeated until the coda at the end which brings it to a close. It builds up texture incorporating a melody in the right hand and long fast arpeggios in the left. There is a distinctive chord pattern which repeats throughout the arpeggios. In the chorus there is a key change and the arpeggios change to incorporate new melodies and motifs.

Track listing

Certifications

References

External links
 Ludovico Einaudi's Official website

1996 classical albums
Ludovico Einaudi albums
Instrumental albums